Since 1993, the Else Lasker-Schüler Dramatist Prize is awarded by the Pfalztheater Kaiserslautern on behalf of the Rhineland-Palatinate Foundation for Culture. The prize is named after expressionist poet Else Lasker-Schüler (1869–1945). It is endowed with €10,000 and one of the most highly endowed playwright prizes in Germany. The award ceremony at the opening of the Theatertage Rheinland-Pfalz in the Pfalztheater or Staatstheater Mainz is carried out by the Prime Minister of Rhineland-Palatinate. Additionally the Stückepreis is awarded for promoting young talents.

Recipients

 1993 
 1995 
 1997  and 
 1999 Rainald Goetz
 2001 Einar Schleef (posthumous)
 2003 Elfriede Jelinek
 2005 Dea Loher
 2008 Fritz Kater
 2010 Roland Schimmelpfennig
 2012 René Pollesch
 2014 Peter Handke
 2016 Sibylle Berg
 2018 
 2020 
 2022 Kathrin Röggla

References

External links
 

German literary awards
German theatre awards
Awards established in 1993
1993 establishments in Germany